Linear dynamical systems are dynamical systems whose evaluation functions are linear.  While dynamical systems, in general, do not have closed-form solutions, linear dynamical systems can be solved exactly, and they have a rich set of mathematical properties.  Linear systems can also be used to understand the qualitative behavior of general dynamical systems, by calculating the equilibrium points of the system and approximating it as a linear system around each such point.

Introduction

In a linear dynamical system, the variation of a state vector 
(an -dimensional vector denoted ) equals a constant matrix
(denoted ) multiplied by 
.  This variation can take two forms: either 
as a flow, in which  varies 
continuously with time

or as a mapping, in which 
 varies in discrete steps

These equations are linear in the following sense: if 
 and  
are two valid solutions, then so is any linear combination 
of the two solutions, e.g., 
 
where  and 
are any two scalars.  The matrix  
need not be symmetric.

Linear dynamical systems can be solved exactly, in contrast to most nonlinear ones.  Occasionally, a nonlinear system can be  solved exactly by a change of variables to a linear system.  Moreover, the solutions of (almost) any nonlinear system can be well-approximated by an equivalent linear system near its fixed points.  Hence, understanding linear systems and their solutions is a crucial first step to understanding the more complex nonlinear systems.

Solution of linear dynamical systems

If the initial vector 
is aligned with a right eigenvector  of 
the matrix , the dynamics are simple

where  is the corresponding eigenvalue;
the solution of this equation is 

as may be confirmed by substitution.

If  is diagonalizable, then any vector in an -dimensional space can be represented by a linear combination of the right  and left eigenvectors (denoted ) of the matrix .

a linear combination of the individual solutions for the right
eigenvectors

Similar considerations apply to the discrete mappings.

Classification in two dimensions 

The roots of the characteristic polynomial det(A - λI) are the eigenvalues of A.  The sign and relation of these roots, to each other may be used to determine the stability of the dynamical system 

,
Thus if  then the eigenvalues are of opposite sign, and the fixed point is a saddle. If  then the eigenvalues are of the same sign. Therefore, if  both are positive and the point is unstable, and if  then both are negative and the point is stable. The discriminant will tell you if the point is nodal or spiral (i.e. if the eigenvalues are real or complex).

See also

 Linear system
 Dynamical system
 List of dynamical system topics
 Matrix differential equation

Dynamical systems